The Mount Data shrew-rat (Rhynchomys soricoides) is a species of rodent in the family Muridae.
It is found only in the Philippines.

References

Rhynchomys
Mammals described in 1895
Taxa named by Oldfield Thomas
Taxonomy articles created by Polbot
Rhynchomys soricoides